Ananthagiri may refer to: 

 Ananthagiri, Ranga Reddy district, Telangana, India
 Ananthagiri, Suryapet district, Telangana, India
 Ananthagiri, Vishakapatnam district, Andhra Pradesh, India
 Ananthagiri Hills, Vikarabad district, Telangana, India